The 2014 season was Bunyodkors 8th season in the Uzbek League in Uzbekistan, of which they were the defending Champions having won the 2013 title. Bunyodkor failed to defend their title, finish the season in 4th position. Bunyodkor won the Uzbekistan Super Cup, reached the Round of 16 in the AFC Champions League, where they were defeated by Al-Hilal, and the final of the  Uzbekistan Cup.

Club

Current technical staff

Players

Squad

Reserve squad
The following players are listed as reserve players to play in 2014 Uzbek Youth League. They are registered for 2014 Uzbek League and are eligible to play for the first team.

Transfers

Winter 2013-14

In:

Out:

Out on loan

Players on Trial
The following players have been on trial during training camps in January–February 2014

 ( Slovan Bratislava)
 ( HTTU Aşgabat)
 ( Arsenal Kyiv)
 ( Sevastopol)

Summer 2014

In:

Out:

Friendly matches

Pre-season

Mid-season

Competitions
Bunyodkor is present in all major competitions: Uzbek League, Uzbek Cup and the AFC Champions League.

Uzbek Super Cup

Uzbek League

Results summary

Results by round

Results

League table

Uzbek Cup

AFC Champions League

Group stage

Knock-out phase

Squad statistics

Appearances and goals

|-
|colspan="14"|Players who left Bunyodkor during the season:

|}

Goal scorers

Disciplinary Record

Notes

References

Sport in Tashkent
FC Bunyodkor seasons
Uzbekistani football clubs 2014 season